Kappadione is a vitamin K derivative used for the treatment of side effects of vitamin K antagonists such as warfarin, prophylaxis and treatment of vitamin K deficiency bleeding, and hypoprothrombinemia due to various causes. It was manufactured by Eli Lilly and Company. Chemically, it is menadiol sodium diphosphate. It was approved by the US Food and Drug Administration prior to 1982 and marketed by Lilly. It has since been discontinued and is not available in North America.

References

Eli Lilly and Company brands
Organophosphates
Naphthol esters
Organic sodium salts